The 2018 Tandridge District Council election took place on 3 May 2018 to elect members of Tandridge District Council in Surrey, England. One third of the council was up for election and the Conservative Party narrowly stayed in overall control of the council.

After the election, the composition of the council was:
Conservative 22
Liberal Democrats 9
Independent 7
Residents' Group 4

Election result
The Conservative group lost eight seats at the election, a net loss of nine from 2014 (by-election loss to Oxted & Limpsfield Residents' Group (OLRG) in Limpsfield ward - Oct, 2016). The Liberal Democrats gained three of these seats, independents took three with OLRG taking the other three, including Limpsfield they had won in the by-election. This left the Conservatives with 22 councillors, compared to 9 for the Liberal Democrats, 7 Independents and 4 in the residents' group. A Conservative majority of one. Overall turnout at the election was 41%.

Ward results

An asterisk* indicates an incumbent seeking re-election.

References 

Tandridge District Council elections

2018 English local elections
2010s in Surrey